Royal Randwick Shopping Centre is a shopping centre in the suburb of Randwick in the Eastern Suburbs of Sydney, Australia.

Transport 
The CBD and South East Light Rail offer frequent services to Randwick Light Rail stop located five minutes away from Royal Randwick Shopping Centre.

Royal Randwick Shopping Centre has Transdev John Holland bus connections to Sydney CBD and Eastern Suburbs, as well as local surrounding suburbs. The majority of its bus services are located on Belmore Road in front of the centre as well as on Alison Road. There is no railway station at Randwick; the nearest station is located at Green Square.

Royal Randwick Shopping Centre also has a multi level car park with 585 spaces.

History 
Royal Randwick Shopping Centre opened in 1990 and featured Franklins, Harris Farm Markets, Best & Less, Amart Sports, a library and 60 speciality stores. Franklins which became Franklins Big Fresh in 1992 closed down and was replaced by Food For Less in 2001.

In August 2004 AMP Capital acquired the centre for $85 million from Nauru.

In 2010 Food For Less was rebranded to Woolworths which was then rebranded to Woolworths Metro in 2020.

Tenants 
Royal Randwick Shopping Centre has 15,145m² of floor space. The major retailers include Woolworths Metro, Harris Farm Markets and Rebel.

References

External links 

 Royal Randwick Shopping Centre Official Website

Shopping centres in Sydney
Shopping malls established in 1990
1990 establishments in Australia